Lucie Duval (born 1959) is a Canadian artist. 

Her 2004 work À la croisée des mots is installed outside the Georges Vanier public library in Montreal. Her work is included in the collection of the Musée national des beaux-arts du Québec and the City of Montreal public art collection

References

Living people
1959 births
20th-century Canadian women artists
21st-century Canadian women artists